The HUMP! annual film festival in Seattle, Washington, and Portland, Oregon, initiated in 2005, showcases home-movie erotica, amateur sex cinema, and locally produced pornography. Films are rated by the audience, and awards are given.  The films are then destroyed before the live audience at the final showing of the festival, by the master of ceremonies, Dan Savage.

HUMP encourages filmmakers to produce entries specifically for HUMP itself, however, the recognition has become so significant that several films which had premiered at HUMP! have been re-released and achieved significant commercial success, most notably among them the gay feature "Lawnboy" and Gloria Brame's short mockumentary, "How To Get A Leg Up In Porn." In 2007 the short film which won "best hardcore" was produced by Two Big Meanies and starred Ms. Leather Washington State, Miss Candy, titled "Lauren Likes Candy." Some HUMP films are entered from out of state, for instance 2010's Twincest was produced by the Atlanta group Le Sexoflex. However, most are produced by anonymous locals.

In popular culture
At the 25th Sundance Film Festival, the independent film Humpday featured characters creating a submission for the HUMP! film festival. The story of two straight men making a gay erotic film for the HUMP! opened to strongly positive reviews.

In 2012, Yvan Attal made a remake of Humpday under the title Do not disturb.

References

External links

HUMP!  The Stranger's annual film festival

Festivals in Seattle
Film festivals in Oregon
Annual events in Portland, Oregon
The Stranger (newspaper)
Film festivals in Washington (state)
Pornography in Oregon
Sexuality in Washington (state)
Dan Savage